Amini may refer to:

People 

 Amini (surname), a surname (family name)
 Amini Fonua (born 1989), Tongan swimmer
 Amini Silatolu (born 1988), American football guard for the Carolina Panthers of the National Football League (NFL)

Places 
 Aminidivi, an island subgroup in the Union Territory of Lakshadweep, India
 Amini Island, a sub-division of the Union Territory of Lakshadweep, India
 Amini, India, a census town in Amini Island, Lakshadweep, India
 Amini Abad, a village in Galehzan Rural District, in the Central District of Khomeyn County, Markazi Province, Iran
 Amini Park, a cricket ground in Port Moresby, Papua New Guinea

See also 
 Yamini (disambiguation)